Terence Samuel T Ratcliffe (1930-1999) was a male boxer who competed for England.

Boxing career
He represented England and won a gold medal in the 67 Kg division at the 1950 British Empire Games in Auckland, New Zealand.

He was part of Royal Air Force and Bristol Boxing Clubs and fought in 51 professional bouts and won the 63rd Amateur Boxing Association British welterweight title, when boxing for the Royal Air Force.

Personal life
He was in the Royal Air Force and his cousin was Josser Watling.

References

1930 births
1999 deaths
English male boxers
Boxers at the 1950 British Empire Games
Commonwealth Games medallists in boxing
Commonwealth Games gold medallists for England
Welterweight boxers
Medallists at the 1950 British Empire Games